The men's 110 metres hurdles at the 1988 Summer Olympics in Seoul, South Korea had an entry list of 43 competitors from 31 nations, with six qualifying heats (43 runners), four second-round races (32) and two semifinals (16) before the final (8) took place on Monday September 26, 1988. The maximum number of athletes per nation had been set at 3 since the 1930 Olympic Congress. The event was won by Roger Kingdom of the United States, the second man to successfully defend Olympic gold in the event (Lee Calhoun, 1956 and 1960). It was the nation's 17th title in the event. Colin Jackson's silver was Great Britain's first medal in the event since 1936.

Background

This was the 21st appearance of the event, which is one of 12 athletics events to have been held at every Summer Olympics. Four finalists from 1984 returned: gold medalist Roger Kingdom of the United States, fourth-place finisher Mark McKoy of Canada, sixth-place finisher Stéphane Caristan of France, and seventh-place finisher Carlos Sala of Spain. Kingdom was a favorite to repeat, having recovered from two hamstring injuries that had plagued him between Games. His biggest competitor was countryman Greg Foster, who had won the 1987 World Championship, but Foster was forced to withdraw after he broke his arm in a race fall before the U.S. Olympic trials. The next two placers at worlds were the Brits Colin Jackson and Jon Ridgeon, who were expected to challenge Kingdom.

Benin, Fiji, Guyana, South Korea, Mauritius, Nepal, Qatar, and Saudi Arabia each made their first appearance in the event. The United States made its 20th appearance, most of any nation (having missed only the boycotted 1980 Games).

Competition format

The competition expanded to a four-round format (previously used once in 1960), still using the eight-man semifinals and finals used since 1964. The "fastest loser" system, also introduced in 1964, was used in the first round.

The first round consisted of six heats, with 7 or 8 hurdlers each. The top five hurdlers in each heat, along with the two next fastest overall, advanced to the semifinals. The 32 quarterfinalists were divided into four heats of 8 hurdlers each, with the top four in each heat advancing. The 16 semifinalists were divided into two semifinals of 8 hurdlers each; again, the top four hurdlers in each advanced to the 8-man final.

Records

These were the standing world and Olympic records (in seconds) prior to the 1988 Summer Olympics.

Kingdom broke his own Olympic record in the quarterfinals, with 13.17 seconds, then again in the final with 12.98 seconds.

Schedule

All times are Korea Standard Time adjusted for daylight savings (UTC+10)

Results

Round 1

Heat 1

Heat 2

Heat 3

Heat 4

Heat 5

Heat 6

Overall results for round 1

Quarterfinals

The quarterfinals were held on Sunday 1988-09-25.

Quarterfinal 1

Quarterfinal 2

Quarterfinal 3

Quarterfinal 4

Semifinals

The semifinals were held on Monday 1988-09-26.

Semifinal 1

Semifinal 2

Final

See also
 1987 Men's World Championships 110m Hurdles (Rome)
 1990 Men's European Championships 110m Hurdles (Split)
 1991 Men's World Championships 110m Hurdles (Tokyo)
 1992 Men's Olympic 110m Hurdles (Barcelona)

References

External links
  Official Report

 1
Sprint hurdles at the Olympics
Men's events at the 1988 Summer Olympics